Patrick Anthony "Pat" Sobeski (25 July 1951 – 17 March 2016) was a Canadian politician, who has served as a member of the House of Commons of Canada from 1988 to 1993, and as mayor of Woodstock from 2010 to 2014.

He was elected in the 1988 federal election at the Cambridge electoral district for the Progressive Conservative party. He served in the 34th Canadian Parliament but lost to Janko Peric of the Liberal Party in the 1993 federal election, finishing with less than half of Peric's votes, and even behind the Reform party's Reg Petersen.

Sobeski served as a municipal councillor in Woodstock, Ontario beginning in 2003. He was elected as the mayor of Woodstock in the 2010 municipal election, defeating incumbent Michael Harding.

Sobeski was defeated by Birtch in a faceoff along with former Mayor Harding in 2014. He died on 17 March 2016.

Electoral record

References

External links

1951 births
2016 deaths
Members of the House of Commons of Canada from Ontario
People from Cambridge, Ontario
Progressive Conservative Party of Canada MPs
People from Woodstock, Ontario
Mayors of places in Ontario